The 1959–60 La Liga was the 29th season since its establishment. The season started on September 13, 1959, and finished on April 17, 1960.

Team locations

League table

Results

Relegation play-offs
Play-off between Córdoba and Real Sociedad was decided after a tie-break match, where Real Sociedad won 1–0.

|}

Pichichi Trophy

External links
 Official LFP Site

1959 1960
1959–60 in Spanish football leagues
Spain